The 1851 Grand National was, at the time, the 14th renewal of a handicap steeplechase horse race that took place at Aintree near Liverpool, England, on 26 February 1851. However, this was later retrospectively recorded as the 13th official running by the Steeplechase Calendar of 1864 when the race of 1838 was disregarded as official.

The race was won by Abd-El-Kader, becoming the first dual winner and the first to do so in consecutive years (discounting The Duke, 1836/1837 whose wins are not included in official race records). Known affectionately as "Little Ab", the horse stood at just under fifteen hands.

Course Changes
The start area from previous years was sowed with wheat so the grass field to the left of this was used instead, although the runners did pass over the wheat field at the start of the second circuit. The span of the water jump in front of the stands was also increased to 15 feet

The third fence, which had previously been a post and rails, was replaced with a ditch and bank and an additional hurdle was placed between the Canal bridge and the racecourse proper.

The first fence was described as the Wheat Fence due to the wheat field that preceded it this year. The Anchor Bridge Crossing was described as Proceed's lane after the well backed horse, which had fallen there two years earlier.

Leading contenders
There was an element of criticism of the event this year due to several highly fancied withdrawals in the days prior to the race.

Rat Trap was listed as an 11/2 favourite after the eve of race betting exchanges, which this year predominantly took place in Lucas' Repository on Great Charlotte Street. This stretched to 6/1 before the off and was based largely on the fact he was being partnered by former winning jockey, Jem Mason and was also carrying eleven lbs less than when failing to complete the course last year. The favourite was prominent as the leaders took the Water jump and remained just off the leaders on the second circuit, unable to mount a challenge, finishing fifth or sixth.

Sir John had finished third last year when sent off as favourite and remained well supported, despite having to give weight to all his rivals. Trained by Richard I'Anson at Curraghmore, Ireland and ridden by John Ryan, Lord Waterford's colours went to the front early on the first circuit and lay at the head of the pack in third place as two runners cut out the second circuit pace. After the final hurdle Sir John was well placed to challenge but remained a couple of lengths adrift of the two in front of him to finish third.

Abd-El-Kader Last year's winner wasn't heavily backed until the day of the race when his appearance on the course attracted the attention of the spectators. Carrying just six lbs more than in victory last year, his owner, Dublin based owner of the Steeplechase Calendar and Irish reporter for sports paper, Bell's Life, Joe Osborne, had secured fellow countryman, Terry Abbott for the ride, which was considered by the public as an improvement on last year's winning partner, Chris Green. This ensured "Little Ab" was sent off as co second favourite at 7/1. Abbott kept the champion handy on the first circuit, lying a close eighth at the Canal Turn and moving up to third at the Water Jump. The Irish rider showed excellent judgement on the second circuit, remaining calm to allow others to gain a lead of over ten lengths before he moved Little Ab up to challenge Sir John for third place coming to proceed's Lane. Abbott then kicked on when entering the racecourse to challenge Maria Day after the final hurdle, going on to win a tight finish by half a neck. As much of the press of the time had already disregarded the races of 1836 and 1837 as Grand National's, he was regarded as the first duel winner of the race.

Vain Hope sometimes listed as Vainhope was the winner of the Wolverhampton Chase in December, beating many of his Aintree opponents. He was also one of two entries for William Vevers, which led the owner to declare which of his two competitors he was placing his faith. The betting public followed and respected Vever's judgement and led to his declared runner being a 7/1 morning second favourite, although he drifted slightly to 8/1 by the off. Under Sam Darling Junior, Vain Hope was kept well to the rear for most of the contest, only starting to make progress after jumping Becher's for the second time. Unfortunately he never gave his backers a run for their money and was never closer than fifth on the run in.

Tipperary Boy Impressed when finishing fourth last year when completely unconsidered by the public. He also impressed again with a front running performance in finishing second in the Worcestershire Grand Annual Chase in December when ridden by Ablett. Duel National winner, Tom Olliver took the mount at Aintree, leading to his being well backed to 10/1 on race day. Olliver took his mount to the front rank right from the off, disputing the lead for much of the first circuit. Tipperary Boy led at the Water jump before Olliver set out to win the race early, increasing the pace to lead by six lengths at Becher's Brook. He maintained his gallop all the way back to the race course when challenged approaching the final hurdle. Tipperary Boy kicked through the timber and rapidly faded to finish unplaced.

The race
Official records only state the first three finishers, the remainder listed merely as having also ran. However, the race was recorded in detail by most national and regional newspapers of the time, largely in agreement with the record published by the Liverpool Mercury.

Sir John and Tipperary Boy cut out the early running. Hope came to the front at Becher's Brook but Chris Green's stirrup leather broke at the Canal Turn and the horse retreated rapidly with no further mention of them, suggesting the horse was pulled up soon after. Peter Simple came to the lead along the Canal Side of the course and was the subject of a large bet that he would be the first to take the Water jump, then known as the Artificial Brook, situated in front of the stands. Tubb's mount led over the fence at the distance chair but was headed by Tipperary Boy over the Water, thus losing the bet.

Sir John was third at this stage followed by Rat Trap, Abd El Kader, Half and Half, Maria Day and Mulligan leading the main body of runners with Vainhope, Volatile and Fugleman bringing up the rear. Volatile fell here and, although remounted, pulled up before reaching the first fence on the second circuit, reported as the Wheat fence. Penrith had been seen to the rear from an early stage and reports suggested he fell on the first circuit.

Peter Simple struggled in the wheat field leaving the racecourse and was pulled up as Tipperary Boy upped the pace, opening up a lead of a length or two to Maria Day and Mulligan who in turn led Sir John by three lengths with Abd El Kader just behind in the main pack. The pace increased with the order remaining the same until the vicinity of the Canal Turn where Mulligan suffered a heavy fall but was quickly remounted. Along the Canal side of the course Tipperary Boy maintained a two length lead over Maria Day, in turn four lengths clear of Sir John as Abd El Kader and Half and Half moved up to dispute third. Vainhope was now steadily improving from the rear and Mulligan was also gaining ground after his fall. The Greysteel Mare and Shinrone both fell at some point along this part of the course, although the latter was remounted while several others retired from the race with victory beyond them.

Coming back onto the racecourse, Maria Day moved up to challenge Tipperary Boy. Abd El Kader moved past the one paced Sir John in third as the remainder failed to make progress. The two leaders jumped the final hurdle together but both crashed through the timber. Maria Day continued but Tipperary Boy tired rapidly to leave Abd El Kader as the only challenger to the mare. Abbott's mount drew level on the run in and got the better of a close finish to claim victory by half a neck. Sir John was a further two lengths down in third with Half and Half fourth. The contemporary reports differ on the order of the remaining finishers but a majority suggest the order was that listed in the finishing order below.

No injury was reported to any of the horses but William Taylor suffered a broken collarbone when he fell from The Victim at Proceed's Lane fence, which is no longer on the course but was where the runners cross Anchor Bridge in the modern era.

Finishing Order
Only the first three were officially recorded. However, there are several detailed reports of the race published in the national and regional newspapers of the time. While each report presents some minor differences, a more detailed picture of the fate of each runner can be taken from the agreement of the majority of reports.

Non-finishers

References

 1851
Grand National
Grand National
19th century in Lancashire
February 1851 sports events